Stratix is a brand of FPGA products developed by Intel, Programmable Solutions Group (former Altera). Other current FPGA product lines include e.g. Agilex, Arria and Cyclone families.

Stratix FPGAs are typically programmed in hardware description languages such as VHDL or Verilog, using the Intel Quartus Prime computer software.

Intel FPGAs have been used in automotive, optical imaging, memory, data processing and computing applications.

References

See also
Virtex (FPGA)

Field-programmable gate arrays
Intel microprocessors
Reconfigurable computing